Dirk Jan De Pree (July 31, 1891 – December 10, 1990) was an American furniture designer.

Early life 
De Pree was born in Zeeland, Michigan, in 1891. His father was a tinsmith who was active in local politics. His grandparents were Dutch Calvinists who had immigrated to Zeeland in the late 19th century.

De Pree graduated from high school in 1909 and went to work as a clerk for the Michigan Star Furniture Company in Zeeland. The company had been formed four years earlier. De Pree's job consisted of general office work, taking orders from his boss.

In 1914, De Pree married Nellie Miller, daughter of Herman Miller. That marriage produced three sons, two of whom would eventually join their father in the business. He also had four daughters.

Career 
In 1923, De Pree decided to found his own business. With the help of a loan from his father-in-law he bought the Michigan Star Furniture Company. (The two purchased 51% of the stock.) He renamed the company Herman Miller in honor of his father-in-law, who was never active in the business.

In 1960, De Pree contracted an illness which cut short his career. He stepped down as CEO in 1961. When he recovered, there was no longer room for him as CEO. The new management team consisted of sons Hugh and Max De Pree. D. J. continued on as chairman emeritus.

Death 
De Pree died on Monday December 10, 1990, at the Fountain View Retirement Village in Holland, Michigan. He was 99 years old.

References

External links 
 Herman Miller

1891 births
1990 deaths
American furniture designers
American people of Dutch descent
People from Zeeland, Michigan
20th-century American businesspeople